The List of number-one digital songs of 2015 in the United States are based upon the highest-selling digital singles ranked in the Hot Digital Songs chart, published by Billboard magazine. The data are compiled by Nielsen SoundScan based on each single's weekly digital sales, which combines sales of different versions of a single for a summarized figure.

Chart history

See also
2015 in music
List of Billboard Hot 100 number-one singles of 2015

References

External links
Current Digital Songs chart

United States Digital Songs
2015
Number-one digital songs